Italian idealism, born from interest in the German movement and particularly in Hegelian doctrine, developed in Italy starting from the spiritualism of the nineteenth-century Risorgimento tradition, and culminated in the first half of the twentieth century in its two greatest exponents: Benedetto Croce and Giovanni Gentile.

Risorgimento Hegelianism
In the age of Romanticism, Italian patriots' philosophical circles, especially in Naples, found in Hegelian idealism the way to give a spiritual and cultural imprint to the historical path towards national unification.

The interest in the Hegelian doctrine in Italy spread especially for the works of Augusto Vera (1813–1885) and Bertrando Spaventa (1817–1883), without omitting also the importance of the studies on Hegel "Aesthetic" by Francesco De Sanctis (1817–1883), author of the Storia della letteratura italiana.

De Sanctis's concept of art and of literary history, inspired by Hegel, will stimulate the genesis of Crocian idealism.

Augusto Vera, author of writings and commentaries about Hegel, was a famous philosopher in Europe, who interpreted the Hegelian Absolute in a religious and transcendent sense.

An opposite interpretation was formulated by Bertrand Spaventa, for whom the Spirit was immanent in the history of philosophy.

Reconstructing the development of Italian philosophy, Spaventa argued that Italian Renaissance thought of Bruno and Campanella had been at the origin of modern philosophy, but had stopped due to the Counter-Reformation. Its task now was to catch up with European philosophy, linking up with Vico's mind philosophy, which along with those of Galluppi, Rosmini, and Gioberti, had anticipated themes of Kantism and German idealism.

Spaventa reformulated the Hegelian dialectic, reinterpreting it from the perspective of Kantian and Fichtian conscientialism or subjectivism.
He considered the act of thinking prevalent with respect to the phases of objectification and synthesis. That is, he supported the need to «mentalise» Hegel, because the Mind is the protagonist of every original production.
The synthesis of the actual thinking of the Spirit was then placed by Spaventa, as the only reality, not only after the hegelian moments of Idea and of Nature, but so as to permeate them also from the beginning.

Gentile and Croce

After a parenthesis characterized by positivism, in 1913 Giovanni Gentile (1875–1944) with the publication of The reform of Hegelian dialectics resumed Spaventa's interpretation of the Hegelian Idea, seeing in Hegelian Spirit the category of becoming as coinciding with the pure act of thought in which the whole reality of nature, history and spirit was transfused.
Every thing exists only in the mental act of thinking it: there are no single empirical entities separated from the trascendental consciousness; even the past lives only in the actual, present moment of memory. To Gentile, who considered himself the "philosopher of Fascism", actual idealism was the sole remedy to philosophically preserving free agency, by making the act of thinking self-creative, and, therefore, without any contingency and not in the potency of any other fact.

Gentile reproached Hegel for having built his dialectic with elements proper to "thought", that is to say that of determined thought and of the sciences. For Gentile, instead, only in "thinking in action" is dialectical self-consciousness that includes everything.

Gentile made a pivotal distinction to factors concerning Idealism's own criteria for reality, which have stood since Berkeley's adage «esse est percipi» by distinguishing between the concrete real «act of thinking» (pensiero pensante), and the abstract «static thought» (pensiero pensato).

To his actual vision was opposed since 1913 Benedetto Croce (1866–1952, cousin of Bertrando Spaventa) who in his Essay on Hegel interpreted Hegelian thought as immanentist historicism: he also understood the Hegelian dialectic of the opposites in a different way, integrating it with that of the «distincts». According to Croce, in fact, the life of the Spirit also consists of autonomous moments that are not opposed, but rather distinct, that is: 
"Art", intuitive knowledge of the particular, which aims to beauty; 
"Philosophy", logical knowledge of the universal, which aims to truth; 
"Economy",  volition of the particular, which aims to usefulness; 
"Ethics", volition of the universal, which aims to good.

Referring to Giambattista Vico, Croce identified philosophy with history, understood not as a capricious sequence of events, but the implementation of Reason, in the light of which it becomes possible the historical understanding of the genesis of facts, and their simultaneous justification with her own unfolding.

Historian's task is therefore to overcome every form of emotionality towards the studied matter, and to present it in form of knowledge, without referring to good or evil.

After having characterized Italian philosophical culture for over forty years, after the second world war the neo-idealism entered a crisis, replaced by existentialism, neo-positivism, phenomenology and marxism.

See also
 Actual idealism
 Giovanni Gentile
 Benedetto Croce
 Bertrando Spaventa
 Italian philosophy

Notes

References
 
 Myra E. Moss, Mussolini's Fascist Philosopher: Giovanni Gentile Reconsidered, Peter Lang, 2004 
 Myra E. Moss, Benedetto Croce: Essays on Literature and Literary Criticism, SUNY Press, 1990 
Bruce Haddock, James Wakefield, Thought Thinking: The Philosophy of Giovanni Gentile, Imprint Academic, 2015 
Roger Wellington Holmes, The idealism of Giovanni Gentile, The Macmillan company, 1937 
Patrick Romanell, Croce Versus Gentile, AMS Press, 1982 
Giuseppe Casale, Benedetto Croce Between Naples and Europe, Peter Lang Pub Incorporated, 1994 
 Eugenio Garin, Cronache di filosofia italiana. 1900-1943, Bari, Laterza, 1955
 Ugo Spirito, L'idealismo italiano e i suoi critici, Florence, Le Monnier, 1930
 Augusto Guzzo, A. Plebe, Gli hegeliani d'Italia, Turin,  Società editrice internazionale, 1953
 Guido Oldrini, L'idealismo italiano tra Napoli e l'Europa, Milan, Guerini, 1998 
 Piero Di Giovanni, Giovanni Gentile: la filosofia italiana tra idealismo e anti-idealismo, Milan, FrancoAngeli, 2003 
 Bertrando Spaventa, Opere, Francesco Valagussa and Vincenzo Vitiello eds., Milan, Bompiani, 2008 
 Giovanni Gentile, L'attualismo, Emanuele Severino ed., Milan, Giunti, 2014

External links

Italian philosophy
Modern history of Italy
Idealism
Italian culture
19th century in Italy
20th century in Italy